Yi County may refer to the following locations:

Yi County, Anhui, Huangshan, Anhui
Yi County, Hebei ( Baoding, Hebei
Yi County, Liaoning, Jinzhou, Liaoning
Yi County, Shandong, now Yicheng District, Zaozhuang